Deodate is an unincorporated community in Dauphin County, Pennsylvania, United States and is part of the Harrisburg-Carlisle Metropolitan Statistical Area.

Deodate is located on east-to-west Route 341 in Conewago Township and the area code is 717. Route 743 runs north-to-south, forms the eastern boundary, and intersects 341 in Deodate.

References

External links 
Profile

Harrisburg–Carlisle metropolitan statistical area
Unincorporated communities in Dauphin County, Pennsylvania
Unincorporated communities in Pennsylvania